Erwin José Caraballo Cabrera (born July 21, 1981 in Cumaná, Sucre) is an amateur Venezuelan Greco-Roman wrestler, who competes in the men's heavyweight category. He won two bronze medals for the 96 kg division at the 2007 Pan American Games in Rio de Janeiro, Brazil, and at the 2011 Pan American Games in Guadalajara, Mexico. Caraballo also defeated Mexico's Joel López for the gold medal in the same division at the 2010 Central American and Caribbean Games in Mayagüez, Puerto Rico. Caraballo is a member of the wrestling team for La Puente Sporting Club, and is coached and trained by Milcho Radulovski.

Caraballo represented Venezuela at the 2012 Summer Olympics in London, where he competed for the men's 96 kg class. He lost the qualifying round match to Estonia's Ardo Arusaar, who was able to score five points in two straight periods, leaving Caraballo without a single point.

References

External links
 NBC Olympics Profile
 

1981 births
Living people
Olympic wrestlers of Venezuela
Wrestlers at the 2012 Summer Olympics
Wrestlers at the 2016 Summer Olympics
Wrestlers at the 2007 Pan American Games
Wrestlers at the 2011 Pan American Games
Pan American Games bronze medalists for Venezuela
People from Cumaná
Venezuelan male sport wrestlers
Pan American Games medalists in wrestling
Central American and Caribbean Games gold medalists for Venezuela
Competitors at the 2010 Central American and Caribbean Games
South American Games gold medalists for Venezuela
South American Games silver medalists for Venezuela
South American Games medalists in wrestling
Competitors at the 2014 South American Games
Central American and Caribbean Games medalists in wrestling
Medalists at the 2007 Pan American Games
Medalists at the 2011 Pan American Games
20th-century Venezuelan people
21st-century Venezuelan people